Robert Nathaniel Heppler (born December 3, 1979 in Natick, Massachusetts) is a footwear designer and writer. He has worked as a professional journalist and blogger.
 
Nike credits him with the design, concept, and packaging of such shoes as the Lobster Dunk and the Coraline Dunk.

Heppler's podcast The Weekly Drop has been featured on Sirius Satellite Radio and syndicated to college radio stations across the country. Heppler also appears as an industry expert on ESPN2.

Heppler graduated from the Wieden+Kennedy 12 program, which focuses on strategy, communication and the crossover between urban culture and mainstream brands.

Heppler is the co-founder of the American luxury brand Buscemi, where he focuses on product design and creative marketing.

He currently lives in Los Angeles, California.

References

1979 births
People from Natick, Massachusetts
Living people